Cicindela limbata, the sandy tiger beetle, is a species of flashy tiger beetle in the family Carabidae. It is found in North America.

Subspecies
These five subspecies belong to the species Cicindela limbata:
 Cicindela limbata hyperborea LeConte, 1863 (hyperboreal tiger beetle)
 Cicindela limbata labradorensis W. N. Johnson, 1991
 Cicindela limbata limbata Say, 1823 (sandy tiger beetle)
 Cicindela limbata nogahabarensis Knisley, 2008 (nogahabar tiger beetle)
 Cicindela limbata nympha Casey, 1913 (sandy tiger beetle)

References

Further reading

 
 

limbata
Articles created by Qbugbot
Beetles described in 1823